The Linnaean Society of New York (LSNY) was established in 1878, in the city of New York, United States of America, by a group of amateurs interested in natural science, especially ornithology. The founding members included H.P. Bailey, Eugene Pintard Bicknell, Ernest Ingersoll, Clinton Hart Merriam and John Burroughs.

References

 Ornithological organizations in the United States
Non-profit organizations based in New York City
1878 establishments in New York (state)
Organizations established in 1878